Rothley is a village and civil parish within the Borough of Charnwood in Leicestershire, England. The population measured at the 2011 census was 3,897.

Rothley centres on two greens, Cross Green and the Town Green, both of which are accessed by a road that leads from the crossroads. The crossroads lies on the old route of the A6 road, which now bypasses the village.

Rothley is one of Leicestershire's most affluent areas based on number of houses worth more than £1 million – especially in some streets such as The Ridgeway, identified in the Sunday Times as the most expensive place to live in the East Midlands.

Most children of primary schooling age attend Rothley (Church of England) Primary School. The main shopping street in the village is Woodgate. Rothley has four churches, Rothley Baptist Church, the Methodist Church, Sacred Heart RC, and the main parish church St Mary & St John's Church of England.

History

Rothley has been inhabited since Saxon times, as evidenced by the ancient Saxon cross in the church graveyard in the village. It is mentioned in the Domesday Book where it is listed as "Rodolei" amongst the lands belonging to the king, William I. The land includes  of meadow, a mill and considerable woodlands. This manor also controlled surrounding pieces of land in a large number of villages including Asfordby, Seagrave and Sileby. Its name may have come from Anglo-Saxon Roþlēah = "meadow in a clearing".

In the Middle Ages, Rothley was home to a manor of the Knights Templar, known as Rothley Temple, but now the Rothley Court Hotel, which passed to the Babington family after the dissolution of the monasteries in the 16th century. The Babington family held the manor for almost 300 years until the death in 1837 of Thomas Babington. Married to Jean Macaulay, the daughter of a Scottish Presbyterian minister, Thomas Babington was MP for Leicester from 1800–1818, and a leading Anglican evangelical. Educated at St John's College, Cambridge alongside William Wilberforce, the two worked closely together on social improvement and famously on the bills to abolish the slave trade.

Wilberforce and Babington spent much time at the Rothley retreat working on the text of the bills, and on the analysis of the Select Committee's enquiries into the trade. Babington was instrumental in rescuing his wife's young brother, Zachary Macaulay, from the mental trauma of working as an overseer on a Jamaican slave plantation, when Zachary came to recuperate at Rothley Temple. Zachary was restored, and with a new Christian faith, went on to a lifetime devoted to the anti-slavery cause, and to have a posthumous bust in his honour placed in Westminster Abbey. Zachary returned often to Rothley, and on one long visit in 1800 his wife Selina (née Mills) gave birth to poet, historian and Whig politician Thomas Babington Macaulay, 1st Baron Macaulay.

In 1899, Rothley railway station was opened on the Great Central Railway, which is now part of the Great Central Steam Railway. The station has been used to film period drama such as the 1988 film Buster and the 2004 Miss Marple TV adaptation of 4.50 from Paddington (where the station stood in for Paddington).

The Bishop's House in Rothley is the home of the suffragan Bishop of Loughborough.

In 1988 Rothley was involved in a cricketing controversy, when then-England captain Mike Gatting was accused by The Sun and Today'' newspapers of improprieties with a barmaid at the Rothley Court Hotel. These accusations led to the sacking of Gatting as captain, despite his protestations of innocence.

In May 2007, Madeleine McCann, who lived in Rothley, disappeared when on holiday in Portugal shortly before her fourth birthday. The village square was decorated with yellow ribbons, teddy bears, notes and cards by people wanting to show support. In September, Rothley became the centre of international media attention when McCann's parents, Kate and Gerry McCann, returned to their home after being formally named as suspects in the investigation into Madeleine's disappearance. The heavy media presence in the village led to tension between journalists and the local community, the majority of whom responded by declining reporters' requests for comment about the case.

Sport

References

External links

Villages in Leicestershire
Civil parishes in Leicestershire
Borough of Charnwood